My Match Is A Makin (English translation of opening track title) is a music album by Irish musicians Moya Brennan and Cormac de Barra. This is Moya's eighth studio album to be released. It was released on 14 April 2010 exclusively to concertgoers on her Spring 2010 tour of the Netherlands. The album was re-released to a wider audience under the title Voices & Harps.

Release
My Match Is A Makin was released during Moya Brennan's April 2010 tour. In January 2011, the album was discontinued and re-released under the new title Voices & Harps with a slightly different track list and remixed/remastered tracks.

Track listing
My Match Is A Makin is the first mainly traditional album recorded by Moya since Clannad's early albums. While made up of folk songs, it also features two new songs; Mo Mhian (Moya originally wrote and recorded the song for the To End All Wars film) and Longing to See You. The album was later re-released in 2011 under the name "Voices & Harps" in collaboration with the Irish harp virtuoso Cormac de Barra. The tracklist suffered a rearrangement and includes one new song called "Casadh Mo Chroí". Also, the song "Mo Mhian" was renamed to "Go Brách".

Personnel
 Moya Brennan – Vocals, Harps, Percussion, Keyboards
 Cormac de Barra – Harps, Vocals, Percussion, Keyboards
 Máire Breatnach – Fiddle, Viola
 Aisling Jarvis – Bouzouki
 Ian Parker – Keyboards
 Recorded and engineered – John Bradshaw & Lochlainn Harte
 Mixed – John Bradshaw & Tim Jarvis
 Photography & sleeve design – Mella Travers
 Photographic location – ArchitecturalSalvage

Release history

References

External links
 Moya Brennan – Official website

Moya Brennan albums
2010 albums